This is a list of junior high schools in Saitama Prefecture.

National

Municipal

Saitama City

 Chūō-ku

 Hachioji (八王子中学校)
 Yono Higashi (与野東中学校)
 Yono Minami (与野南中学校)
 Yono Nishi (与野西中学校)

 Iwatsuki-ku

 Hakuyo (柏陽中学校)
 Iwatsuki (岩槻中学校)
 Jionji (慈恩寺中学校)
 Johoku (城北中学校)
 Jonan (城南中学校)
 Kawadoori (川通中学校)
 Nishihara (西原中学校)
 Sakurayama (桜山中学校)

 Kita-ku

 Miyahara (宮原中学校)
 Nisshin (日進中学校)
 Taihei (泰平中学校)
 Toro (土呂中学校)
 Uetake (植竹中学校)

 Midori-ku

 Harayama (原山中学校)
 Higashi Urawa (東浦和中学校)
 Mimuro (三室中学校)
 Misono (美園中学校)
 Misono Minami (美園南中学校)
 Omagi (尾間木中学校)

 Minami-ku

 Kishi (岸中学校)
 Minami Urawa (南浦和中学校)
 Oyaba (大谷場中学校)
 Oyaguchi (大谷口中学校)
 Shirahata (白幡中学校)
 Uchiya (内谷中学校)

 Minuma-ku

 Haruno (春野中学校)
 Harusato (春里中学校)
 Katayanagi (片柳中学校)
 Nanasato (七里中学校)
 Omiya Yahata (大宮八幡中学校)
 Osato (大砂土中学校)
 Oya (大谷中学校)

 Nishi-ku

 Mamiya (馬宮中学校)
 Miyamae (宮前中学校)
 Omiya Nishi (大宮西中学校)
 Sashiogi (指扇中学校)
 Tsuchiya (土屋中学校)
 Uemizu (植水中学校)

 Omiya-ku

 No. 2 (Daini) Higashi (第二東中学校)
 Mihashi (三橋中学校)
 Omiya Higashi (大宮東中学校)
 Omiya Kita (大宮北中学校)
 Omiya Minami (大宮南中学校)
 Onari (大成中学校)
 Sakuragi (桜木中学校)

 Sakura-ku

 Kami Okubo (上大久保中学校)
 Okubo (大久保中学校)
 Tajima (田島中学校)
 Tsuchiai (土合中学校)

 Urawa-ku

 Kizaki (木崎中学校)
 Motobuto (本太中学校)
 Ohara (大原中学校)
 Tokiwa (常盤中学校)
 Urawa Junior and Senior High School (浦和中学校・高等学校)

Other municipalities

Private
 Saitama Korean Elementary and Middle School (埼玉朝鮮初中級学校). This school was previously in the City of Ōmiya.

See also
 List of elementary schools in Saitama Prefecture

References

Schools in Saitama Prefecture
Saitama Prefecture